Saphenophis is a genus of snakes in the subfamily Dipsadinae of the family Colubridae. The genus is native to northwestern South America.

Geographic range
Species in the genus Saphenophis are found in Colombia and Ecuador.

Species
Five species are recognized as being valid.
 Saphenophis antioquiensis (Dunn, 1943)
 Saphenophis atahuallpae (Steindachner, 1901)
 Saphenophis boursieri (Jan, 1867)
 Saphenophis sneiderni Myers, 1973
 Saphenophis tristriatus (Rendahl & Vestergren, 1941)

Nota bene: A binomial authority in parentheses indicates that the species was originally described in a genus other than Saphenophis.

Etymology
The specific name, boursieri, is in honor of French ornithologist Jules Bourcier.

The specific name, sneiderni, is in honor of Swedish taxidermist Kjell von Sneidern (1910–2000), who collected natural history specimens in Colombia.

References

Further reading
Freiberg M (1982). Snakes of South America. Hong Kong: T.F.H. Publications. 189 pp. . (Genus Saphenophis, p. 109).
Myers CW (1973). "A New Genus for Andean Snakes Related to Lygophis boursieri and a New Species (Colubridae)". American Museum Novitates (2522): 1-37. (Saphenophis, new genus, p. 2; Saphenophis sneiderni, new species, p. 22).

Dipsadinae
Snake genera